Isaac Bernard Hampton (born August 22, 1951 in Camden, South Carolina) is a former Major League Baseball catcher.  He graduated from  Camden High School in Camden, SC and signed by the New York Mets as an amateur free agent on August 22, 1970 and played for the Mets (1974) and the California Angels (1975–1979).

Hampton made his major league debut as a pinch hitter on September 12, 1974 at Shea Stadium. Batting for first baseman John Milner in the bottom of the 9th against Al Hrabosky of the St. Louis Cardinals, he flew out to center field.  During spring training of 1975, he was traded to the Angels for relief pitcher Ken Sanders.

Hampton's best year in the big leagues was 1977, when he stayed with the Angels for the entire season.  In 52 games he batted .295 (13-for-44) with 3 home runs and 9 runs batted in.

Career totals include 113 games played, a .207 batting average (28-for-135), 4 HR, 18 RBI, 15 runs scored, and a .341 slugging percentage.  He had a strong arm, and threw out 18 of 48 stolen base attempts. (37.5%)

He was released by California on April 1, 1980. In 1981, he played for the Kintetsu Buffaloes in Japan.

References
1980 Baseball Register published by The Sporting News

External links

Retrosheet

Major League Baseball catchers
California Angels players
New York Mets players
American expatriate baseball players in Japan
Kintetsu Buffaloes players
Baseball players from South Carolina
Pompano Beach Mets players
Visalia Mets players
1951 births
Living people